Mesoneura is a genus of sawflies belonging to the family Tenthredinidae.

The species of this genus are found in Europe, Eastern Asia and Northern America.

Species:
 Mesoneura lanigera Benson, 1954
 Mesoneura nigrostigmata Haris, 2001

References

Tenthredinidae
Sawfly genera